The Hyderabad women's cricket team is the women's representative cricket team for Hyderabad. They competed in the National Women's Cricket Championship between 2004–05 and 2017.

History
Hyderabad joined the National Women's Cricket Championship for its inaugural season in 2004–05, beating Peshawar in the initial knock-out stage before finishing third in the final Super League. The side went on to compete in every edition of the National Women's Cricket Championship until it ended in 2017, but did not better their best finish from their first season. They finished second in their group in 2005–06, 2006–07 and 2014.

Players

Notable players
Players who played for Hyderabad and played internationally are listed below, in order of first international appearance (given in brackets):

 Sajjida Shah (2000)
 Sumaiya Siddiqi (2007)
 Natalia Pervaiz (2017)

Seasons

National Women's Cricket Championship

Honours
 National Women's Cricket Championship:
 Winners (0):
 Best finish: 3rd (2004–05)

See also
 Hyderabad cricket team (Pakistan)

References

Women's cricket teams in Pakistan